Mateo Aston Edward Henry (born 1 May 1993) is a Panamanian sprinter. He is the younger brother of Alonso Edward.

Edward finished eighth in the 100 metres at the 2010 Summer Youth Olympics. He also competed in the 60 metres at the 2012 IAAF World Indoor Championships running a personal best 6.91.

Personal bests

Outdoor
100 m: 10.29 s (wind: -1.4 m/s) –  Hattiesburg, Mississippi, 3 May 2014
200 m: 21.36 s (wind: +1.5 m/s) –  San Salvador, 26 May 2012

Indoor
60 m: 6.70 s –  Daytona Beach, Florida, 20 February 2016

Achievements

References

External links

Tilastopaja biography

1993 births
Living people
Panamanian male sprinters
Athletes (track and field) at the 2010 Summer Youth Olympics
Sportspeople from Panama City
Athletes (track and field) at the 2018 South American Games
Central American Games gold medalists for Panama
Central American Games medalists in athletics
Central American Games silver medalists for Panama
Central American Games bronze medalists for Panama
20th-century Panamanian people
21st-century Panamanian people